Surabhi C. M., also known as Surabhi Lakshmi is an Indian film, television, and stage actress who appears in Malayalam films and television. She won the National Film Award for Best Actress in 2016 for portraying the role of a struggling middle-aged mother in the Malayalam film Minnaminungu.

She is known for the role as Pathu through the Malayalam Comical Television Series M80 Moosa which launched on Media One TV.

Personal life
Lakshmi was born to parents Andy and Radha on 16 November 1986. She is from Narikkuni in Kozhikode, Kerala. She gained a BA degree in Bharathanatyam with first rank from Sree Sankaracharya University of Sanskrit, Kalady. She gained a MA degree in Theatre Arts from Sree Sankaracharya University of Sanskrit and M.Phil in Performing Arts from Mahatma Gandhi University. As of 2017, she is a Ph.D student in performing arts at the Sree Sankaracharya University of Sanskrit.

Career

Lakshmi won the reality show "Best Actor" on Amrita TV.

She won the National Film Award for Best Actress in the 64th National Film Awards, the special jury mention in the Kerala State Film Awards 2016, and the Malayalam Film Critics Award 2016 for Second Best Actress, all for her performance in the film Minnaminungu. She has acted in more than twenty Malayalam films and two television serials.

Filmography

Films

Short films and Web series

Television

Theater performance

Awards

References

External links 

  

 Official Facebook page
 Press Information Bureau, Government of India (64th National Film Awards, 2016 Announcement)

Living people
Actresses in Malayalam cinema
Indian film actresses
Actresses from Kozhikode
Indian stage actresses
Indian television actresses
People from Kozhikode district
21st-century Indian actresses
Best Actress National Film Award winners
Kerala State Film Award winners
Actresses in Malayalam television
1986 births
Actresses in Tamil cinema